Raiz Invest Limited (formerly Acorns) is an Australian financial technology company operating in Australia, Indonesia and Malaysia. It is listed on the Australian Securities Exchange (ASX:RZI). It allows Australian customers to micro-invest the remaining round up of everyday purchases in exchange traded funds. 

As of October 2021, the service has 419,552 monthly active users with $694.27 million funds under management. The total revenue during FY2020 was $10.3 million. George Simon Lucas and Brendan Malone are joint Group CEOs of the company, with George Lucas also being the Managing Director.

The average user investment portfolio of Raiz Invest grew 11 per cent a year since start in February 2016. 
70% of customers are aged between 18 and 35, and over 80% invest at least once a month into their account. The minimum investment to open an account is $5.

Superannuation scheme 
Raiz Invest super was launched on 16 July 2018, designed as a superannuation product. It currently has $69.7 million funds under management.

International expansion 
Indonesia continues to demonstrate momentum with 112,000 customers having
signed up to the app.
More opportunities are opening up in Indonesia to increase market penetration;
Work has begun to develop new products with the prominent Indonesian
cornerstone investor who took equity in the November 2019 placement. 
Activation of charging monthly fees has been turned on in Indonesia.
Malaysia is live with 40,000 customers so far.

Awards 
Raiz was awarded Australia's Investment Innovator of the Year at the 2017, 2018 and 2019 FinTech Business Awards.

References

External links 
 Official website

Companies based in Sydney
Software companies of Australia
Australian brands
Companies listed on the Australian Securities Exchange
Financial software companies